Area codes 306, 639, and 474 are telephone area codes in the North American Numbering Plan (NANP) for the entire Canadian province of Saskatchewan. Area code 306 is the original area code, and area codes 639 and 474 were added to create an overlay plan for the entire province. The incumbent local exchange carrier is SaskTel.

Area code 306 is one of the original North American area codes, which were assigned in 1947 in the contiguous United States and the nine provinces then in Canada.

By the mid-2000s, area code 306 was on the brink of exhaustion because of demand for telecommunication services from the proliferation of cell phones and other mobile devices requiring unique telephone numbers, particularly in Regina and Saskatoon.

In October 2010, in order to facilitate long-term planning nationwide, the Canadian Radio-television and Telecommunications Commission (CRTC) tentatively reserved a number of new area codes for the future relief of existing area codes that were expected to exhaust in the next 25 years; area code 474 was set aside to cover area code 306 and the province of Saskatchewan.

In early 2011, however, a routine analysis by the Canadian Numbering Administrator (CNA) revealed that area code 306 had experienced an unforecasted surge in phone number allocation and was at risk of exhaustion within three years (a situation referred to as a "jeopardy condition"). In response, the CRTC immediately initiated relief planning measures.

The planning committee evaluated multiple options involving a north-south split of 306, with half the province retaining 306 while the other half transferred to a new area code. Ultimately, the committee determined that an overlay area code was overwhelmingly better. Given the CRTC's decision the year before, the committee's initial planning document (dated May 18, 2011) recommended the assignment of area code 474 for this purpose, mirroring an assumption that had already been reported in the press.

However, by the time the committee's planning document was finalized on July 13, 2011, the recommended new area code had changed to 639, an option that was regarded as equally technically viable. The document did not address this divergence from the CRTC's prior allocation nor give a reason for the change, but news reports suggest that it was SaskTel who made the decision to eschew 474, citing a sensitivity to tetraphobia in the community, and that the choice of 639 as a replacement was based on its mathematical similarities with the existing area code.

The decision to implement 639 as an overlay had the effect of allocating 15.8 million numbers to a province of just over a million people. However, SaskTel and other carriers wanted to spare existing subscribers, particularly in rural areas, the expense and burden of changing their numbers. Overlays have become the preferred method of area code relief in Canada; no area codes have been split in the country since 1999. Ten-digit dialing began in 2012 and became mandatory throughout the province in May 2013.

On August 26, 2011, the CRTC accepted the relief planning committee's recommendation. In accordance with the CRTC's final decision, ten-digit dialing was phased in for area code 306 starting on February 25, 2013. On that date, a permissive dialing period began during which seven- and ten-digit calls could complete. Ten-digit dialing became mandatory in Saskatchewan on May 11, 2013; attempts to make seven-digit calls triggered intercept messages reminding callers of the new rule. Area code 639 was to be overlaid onto 306 effective May 25, 2013. Beginning on September 26, 2013, seven-digit dialing no longer functioned. Until the implementation of area code 639, Saskatchewan was the last of Canada's original NPAs where seven-digit dialing was still possible.

In July 2018, area code 474 was reserved as a future area code for all of Saskatchewan, as area codes 306 and 639 are expected to exhaust as early as June 2022. Area code 474 was allocated on October 2, 2021.

Service area and central office prefixes
Arborfield: (306) - 768
Balgonie: (306) - 702 771
Beauval: (306) - 288
Borden: (306) - 997
Bredenbury: (306) - 620 898
Buchanan: (306) - 592
Calder: (306) - 742
Canora: (306) - 563
Carrot River: (306) - 401 768 
Central Butte: (306) - 796
Churchbridge: (306) - 896
Colonsay: (306) - 255
Dalmeny: (306) - 254
Dubuc: (306) - 877
Esterhazy: (306) - 701 745
Estevan: (306) - 308 339 340 415 421 461 471 634 636 637 687 (639) - 450 534
Eston: (306) - 402
Eyebrow: (306) - 759
Foam Lake: (306) - 272
Fort Qu'Appelle: (306) - 331 332 804 900
Francis: (306) - 245
Goodeve: (306) - 876
Grayson & Crooked Lake: (306) - 794
Hanley: (306) - 544
Hudson Bay: (306) - 470 865 
Humboldt: (306) - 231 289 320 366 367 368 598 682 944 (639) - 535
Invermay: (306) - 493
Kamsack: (306) - 542 591
Kelvington: (306) - 327
Kindersley: (306) - 379 430 460 463 512 604 806 838 965 967 968 (639) - 539
Kenaston: (306) - 252
Langenburg: (306) - 496 740 743
Lemberg: (306) - 335
Lloydminster: (306) - 214 307 603 808 820 821 825 830 875 (639) - 536 840
Lumsden: (306) - 731 (639) - 392
Luseland: (306) - 372
Marquis: (306) - 788
Meadow Lake: (306) - 234 236 240 304 819 (639) - 537
Meath Park: (306) - 929
Melfort: (306) - 275 277 346 752 863 920 921
Melville: (306) - 607 705 707 720 728 730 748 760
Milestone: (306) - 436 (639) - 440 450
Mistatim: (306) - 889
Moose Jaw: (306) - 214 313 556 624 630 631 681 684 690 691 692 693 694 704 756 905 972 983 990 (639) - 538
Neudorf: (306) - 748
Nipawin: (306) - 862
Norquay: (306) - 594
North Battleford: (306) - 208 317 386 407 440 441 445 446 470 480 481 490 499 817 906 937
Pelly: (306) - 595
Pilot Butte: (306) - 584 586 781 
Porcupine Plain: (306) - 278 
Preeceville: (306) - 547
Prince Albert: (306) - 314 557 703 763 764 765 904 922 930 940 941 953 960 961 970 980 981 987 (639) - 314 533 760
Prud'homme: (306) - 654, (639) - 653
Radisson: (306) - 827 (639) - 913
Regina: (306) - 201 205 206 209 216 337 347 351 352 359 450 501 502 503 509 510 517 519 520 522 523 525 526 527 529 530 531 533 535 536 537 539 540 541 543 545 546 550 551 552 559 564 565 566 569 570 580 581 584 585 586 591 596 719 721 737 751 757 761 766 775 777 779 780 781 787 789 790 791 797 798 807 908 910 924 926 936 949 988 992 993 994 995 999 (639)-221 316 444 528 560 571 590 600 601 602 603 604 605 606 607 608 609 625 640 641 642 643 644 645 646 647 648 649 739 740 888 915 955 997 999
Rhein: (306) - 273
Rocanville: (306) - 645
Rose Valley: (306) - 322
Rouleau: (306) - 776, (639) - 394
Saltcoats: (306) - 744
Saskatoon: (306) - 200 202 203 220 221 222 227 229 230 241 242 244 249 250 251 260 261 262 270 280 281 290 291 292 321 341 343 361 370 371 373 374 380 381 382 384 385 477 491 500 514 518 612 649 651 652 653 655 657 659 664 665 667 668 683 700 713 715 716 717 803 844 850 866 875 880 881 899 902 912 914 931 933 934 938 952 955 956 964 966 974 975 977 978 979 985 986 996 998 (639) - 220 317 470 471 480 630 635 887 916 994 996 998
Sheho: (306) - 849
St. Isidore-de-Bellevue: (306) - 423
Stockholm: (306) - 793
Strasbourg: (306) - 725 (639) - 914
Sturgis: (306) - 548
Swift Current: (306) - 315 437 712 741 750 770 772 773 774 778 816 907 971 973 (639) - 541
Theodore: (306) - 647
Tisdale: (306) - 873
Unity: (306) - 228
Uranium City: (306) - 498
Wadena: (306) - 338
Watrous: (306) - 917 946 (639)-395
Weyburn: (306) - 405 504 509 809 842 848 861 869 870 891 897 908
Wynyard: (306) - 554
Yorkton: (306) - 316 521 620 621 641 708 782 783 786 818 828 890 909 (639) - 540
Premium services: 1+(306/639) - 976.

See also 

 Telephone numbers in Canada
 Canadian Numbering Administration Consortium

References

External links 
NANPA planning letter PL-439 with diagrams and maps showing application of 639.
CNA exchange list for area +1-306
CNA exchange list for area +1-639
Telecom archives
 Area Code Map of Canada

306
Area codes
Area codes